V. africana may refer to:
 Verbena africana, a plant species in the genus Verbena
 Voacanga africana, a tree species

See also
 Africana (disambiguation)